"Summer of Love" is the first single from the album Bouncing off the Satellites by American new wave band The B-52's. 

The single peaked at No. 3 on the Billboard Hot Dance Club Play chart, making it their highest entry up to that point (although 1994's "(Meet) The Flintstones" would reach the same position on the chart). 

The original 1985 demo version was released on the B-52's 1998 compilation album Time Capsule: Songs for a Future Generation.

The single was reissued in 2017 as a limited edition 12" red vinyl.

Track listing
7" single
 "Summer of Love" – 4:02
 "Housework" – 4:04

12" single
 "Summer of Love" (Summer Party Mix) – 6:04
 "Summer of Love" (Love Dub) – 7:47
 "Summer of Love" (Single Edit) – 3:58

Charts

Use in popular culture
This song is featured in the 1988 film, Earth Girls Are Easy.

References

1986 singles
The B-52's songs
Songs written by Kate Pierson
Songs written by Keith Strickland
Songs written by Cindy Wilson
Song recordings produced by Tony Mansfield
Warner Records singles
1986 songs